Diplodactylus furcosus, sometimes called the Ranges stone gecko or forked gecko, is a gecko endemic to Australia.

References

Diplodactylus
Reptiles described in 1863
Taxa named by Wilhelm Peters
Geckos of Australia